MŠK Námestovo is a Slovak football team, based in the town of Námestovo. The club was founded in 1931.

Honours
 Slovak third division (Group Middle) (1993–)
  Winners (1): 2020–21

Current squad

For recent transfers, see List of Slovak football transfers winter 2021–22.

Notable managers
  Pavol Strapáč (2018–2021)
  Miroslav Trnka (2021)
  Vladimír Cifranič (Sep 2021-Dec 2021)
  Roman Marčok (Jan 2022-)

External links 
Futbalnet profile 
at namestovo.sk

References

Namestovo
Association football clubs established in 1931
1931 establishments in Slovakia